André Gustave Fernand Raynaud, best known as Fernand Raynaud (May 19, 1926 – September 28, 1973), was a French stand-up comic star, an actor and a singer.

Biography
Fernand Raynaud was one of the most renowned standup comedians among French comic actors of the 1950s and 1960s. He began his career playing and singing in cabarets and music halls, then he gained popularity through performances broadcast on television. He's renowned for playing typical, average Frenchmen characters, especially the silly ones, making funny faces and using mime and slapstick humor. In 1973, Raynaud was killed in a car crash in Le Cheix, near Riom, France.

Sketch comedy
Allô Tonton, pourquoi tu tousses ?
Aux deux folles
Avec deux croissants...
J'm'amuse
C'est étudié pour
Heureux !
J'ai souffert dans ma jeunesse
La 2 CV de ma sœur
La bougie
La chatte à ma sœur
Le douanier
La pipe à pépé
La prévention routière
La tasse de lait
Le 22 à Asnières
Le bègue
Le bluff
Le fromage de Hollande
Le défilé militaire
Le match de boxe
Le paysan (Ç'a eut payé, Crésus)
Le peintre et son modèle
Le plombier
Le réfrigérateur
Le tailleur
Le timbre à 0.25 F
Les œufs cassés
L'inspecteur des platanes
Ma sœur s'est mariée
Moi, mon truc c'est le vélo
Ne me parle pas de Grenoble
Restons Français
Un certain temps
Un mariage en grandes pompes
Vive le camping
Vlan, passe-moi l'éponge
Zanzi Bar

Filmography

Cinema
1955: La Bande à papa, directed by Guy Lefranc: Fernand Jérôme
1955: 33 tours et puis s'en vont, directed by Henri Champetier
1956: Fernand Cow-boy, directed by Guy Lefranc: Fernand Mignot
1956: La vie est belle, directed by Roger Pierre and Jean-Marc Thibault
1957: C'est arrivé à 36 chandelles, directed by  Henri Diamant-Berger and Fernand Rivers
1957: Fernand clochard, directed by Pierre Chevalier: Fernand
1958: Arènes joyeuses, directed by Maurice de Canonge: Fernand Cyprien de Chalamond
1958: Le Sicilien, directed by Pierre Chevalier: Fernand
1959: Houla-houla, directed by Robert Darène: Fernand Martin
1959: Minute papillon, directed by  Jean Lefèvre: Oscar
1959: La Marraine de Charley, directed by  Pierre Chevalier: Charley Rivoire/Gabrielle de la Motte
1960: Le Mouton,  directed by Pierre Chevalier: Fernand Castel
1961: Auguste directed by Pierre Chevalier: Auguste Roussel
1962: It's Not My Business, directed by Jean Boyer: Fernand Raynaud/Gaspard
1962: Nous irons à Deauville, directed by Francis Rigaud
1968: Salut Berthe !, directed by  Guy Lefranc: Adrien Chautard
1969: L'Auvergnat et l'autobus, directed by  Guy Lefranc: Julien Brulebois

Television
1961: La Belle Américaine, directed by Robert Dhéry
1967: Auguste, play directed by Raymond Castans, TV broadcasting.

Theatre
1958: Auguste, play directed by Raymond Castans, production by Jean Wall, Théâtre des Nouveautés
1962: Le Bourgeois gentilhomme by Molière, production by Jean-Pierre Darras, Théâtre Hébertot

Songs 
Fernand Raynaud sang the following songs, most of them written by Raymond Mamoudy and played by Marcel Rossi (piano player):
 Et v'lan passe moi l'éponge
 Avec l'ami bidasse
 Lena
 Telle qu'elle est

References

External links
 
  Fernand Raynaud 'Le douanier' (video) (1972)

French stand-up comedians
1926 births
1973 deaths
French male film actors
French male television actors
French male stage actors
20th-century French male actors
20th-century French comedians
Road incident deaths in France